The Emilia Romagna Grand Prix is a Formula One motor racing event held at the Autodromo Internazionale Enzo e Dino Ferrari, often referred to as "Imola" after the town where it is located. The event takes the name "Emilia Romagna" from the Italian region where the circuit is located.

History

2020–2021 

The COVID-19 pandemic in 2020 led to disruption of the originally scheduled race calendar, with a number of races cancelled. The Emilia Romagna Grand Prix was added to the revised calendar intended as a "one-off" race, as one of several new or returning Grands Prix, in order to make up for the loss of other races. The event used a one-off, two-day weekend format, with one practice session, on Saturday, rather than the usual three. Mercedes' Valtteri Bottas qualified on pole, with teammate Lewis Hamilton winning the race.

Despite originally being intended to be held as a one-off event in 2020, due to the ongoing nature of the COVID-19 pandemic the Emilia Romagna Grand Prix returned in 2021 on 18 April, replacing the postponed Chinese Grand Prix as the second round of the 2021 season. Lewis Hamilton took pole with Max Verstappen winning a dramatic, rain affected race.

2022 

The event appeared on the 2022 calendar for a third consecutive edition, and hosted one of the three sprint formats during the season for the first time. In early 2022, the organisers announced that a contract had been signed to continue organising the Grand Prix until 2025. The Grand Prix awarded Max Verstappen with his second grand chelem as he won the race for the second straight year.

Winners of the Emilia Romagna Grand Prix

Repeat winners (drivers)
Drivers in bold are competing in the Formula One championship in the current season.

Repeat winners (constructors) 
Teams in bold are competing in the Formula One championship in the current season.

By year
All Emilia Romagna Grands Prix were held at Autodromo Internazionale Enzo e Dino Ferrari.

References

 
Formula One Grands Prix
Motorsport in Italy
Imola Circuit
Recurring sporting events established in 2020
2020 establishments in Italy